Liechtenstein previously used the Swiss telephone numbering plan (+41) under area code 075. (This was dialled as +41 75 from outside Switzerland and Liechtenstein). However, on 5 April 1999, it adopted its own international code +423. Consequently, calls from Switzerland now require international dialling, using the 00423 prefix and the seven-digit number.

 Liechtenstein Numbering Plan (ITU-T E.164)

References

Liechtenstein
Telecommunications in Liechtenstein
Liechtenstein-related lists
Liechtenstein–Switzerland relations